A cnidocyte (also known as a cnidoblast or nematocyte) is an explosive cell containing one large secretory organelle called a cnidocyst (also known as a cnida or nematocyst) that can deliver a sting to other organisms. The presence of this cell defines the phylum Cnidaria (corals, sea anemones, hydrae, jellyfish, etc.). Cnidae are used to capture prey and as a defense against predators. A cnidocyte fires a structure that contains a toxin within the cnidocyst; this is responsible for the stings delivered by a cnidarian.

Structure and function 

Each cnidocyte contains an organelle called a cnida, cnidocyst, nematocyst, ptychocyst or spirocyst. This organelle consists of a bulb-shaped capsule containing a coiled hollow tubule structure attached to it. An immature cnidocyte is referred to as a cnidoblast or nematoblast. The externally oriented side of the cell has a hair-like trigger called a cnidocil, which is a mechano- and chemo-receptor. When the trigger is activated, the tubule shaft of the cnidocyst is ejected and, in the case of the penetrant nematocyst, the forcefully ejected tubule penetrates the target organism. This discharge takes a few microseconds, and is able to reach accelerations of about 40,000 g. Recent research suggests the process occurs in as little as 700 nanoseconds, thus reaching an acceleration of up to 5,410,000 g. After penetration, the toxic content of the nematocyst is injected into the target organism, allowing the sessile cnidarian to capture the immobilized prey. Recently, in two sea anemone species (Nematostella vectensis and Anthopleura elegantissima), the type I neurotoxin protein Nv1 was shown to be localized in ectodermal gland cells in the tentacles, next to but not in nematocytes. Upon encounter with a crustacean prey, nematocytes discharge and pierce the prey, and Nv1 is massively secreted into the extracellular medium by the nearby gland cells, thus suggesting another mode of entry for toxins.

Cnidocyte capsule composition 
The cnidocyte capsule is made of novel Cnidaria-specific genes which combine known protein domains. Minicollagen genes are one of the major structural components of the capsule. They are very short genes containing the characteristic collagen-triple helix sequence, as well as polyproline domains and cystein-rich domains. Trimers of minicollagen proteins assemble through their terminal cystein-rich domain, forming highly organized and rigid supra-structures. Minicollagen 1 Ncol-1 polymers assemble on the inner shell while the outer capsule is composed of polymerized NOWA (Nematocyst Outer Wall Antigen) proteins. Nematogalectin, minicollagen Ncol-15 and chondroitin are novel proteins used to build the tubule shaft. In piercing cnidocytes, the novel protein spinalin is used to make the spines present at the base of the shaft.

Discharge mechanism 

The cnidocyst capsule stores a large concentration of calcium ions, which are released from the capsule into the cytoplasm of the cnidocyte when the trigger is activated. This causes a large concentration gradient of calcium across the cnidocyte plasma membrane. The resulting osmotic pressure causes a rapid influx of water into the cell. This increase in water volume in the cytoplasm forces the coiled cnidae tubule to eject rapidly. Prior to discharge the coiled cnidae tubule exists inside the cell in an "inside out" condition. The back pressure resulting from the influx of water into the cnidocyte together with the opening of the capsule tip structure or operculum, triggers the forceful eversion of the cnidae tubule causing it to right itself as it comes rushing out of the cell with enough force to impale a prey organism.

Prey detection 

Cnidae are "single use" cells, and thus represent a large expenditure of energy to produce. In Hydrozoans, in order to regulate discharge, cnidocytes are connected as "batteries", containing several types of cnidocytes connected to supporting cells and neurons. The supporting cells contain chemosensors, which, together with the mechanoreceptor on the cnidocyte (cnidocil), allow only the right combination of stimuli to cause discharge, such as prey swimming, and chemicals found in prey cuticle or cuteous tissue. This prevents the cnidarian from stinging itself although sloughed off cnidae can be induced to fire independently.

Types of cnidae 
Over 30 types of cnidae are found in different cnidarians. They can be divided into the following groups:
 Penetrant: The penetrant or stenotele is the largest and most complex nematocyst. When discharged, it pierces the skin or chitinous exoskeleton of the prey and injects the venomous fluid, hypnotoxin, that either paralyzes the victim or kills it.
 Glutinant: a sticky surface used to stick to prey, referred to as ptychocysts and found on burrowing (tube) anemones, which help create the tube in which the animal lives
 Volvent: The volvent or desmoneme is a small and pear-shaped nematocyst. It contains a short, thick, spineless, smooth and elastic thread tube forming a single loop and closed at the far end. When discharged, it tightly coils around the prey. They are the smallest nematocysts. A lasso-like string is fired at prey and wraps around a cellular projection on the prey, which are referred to as spirocysts.

Cnidocyte subtypes can be differentially localized in the animal. In the sea anemone Nematostella vectensis, the majority of its non-penetrant sticky cnidocytes, the spirocytes, are found in the tentacles, and are thought to help with prey capture by sticking to the prey. By contrast, the two penetrant types of cnidocytes present in this species display a much broader localization, on the outer epithelial layer of the tentacles and body column, as well as on the pharynx epithelium and within mesenteries.

The diversity of cnidocytes types correlates with the expansion and diversification of structural cnidocyst genes like minicollagen genes. Minicollagen genes form compact gene clusters in Cnidarian genomes, suggesting a diversification through gene duplication and subfunctionalization. Anthozoans display less capsule diversity and a reduced number of minicollagen genes, and medusozoans have more capsule diversity (about 25 types) and a vastly expanded minicollagen genes repertoire. In the sea anemone Nematostella vectensis, some minicollagens display a differential expression pattern in different cnidocytes subtypes.

Cnidocyte development 
Cnidocytes are single-use cells that need to be continuously replaced throughout the life of the animal with different mode of renewal across species.

Modes of renewal 

In Hydra polyps, cnidocytes differentiate from a specific population of stem cells, the interstitial cells (I-cells) located within the body column. Developing nematocytes first undergo multiple rounds of mitosis without cytokinesis, giving rise to nematoblast nests with 8, 16, 32 or 64 cells. After this expansion phase, nematoblasts develop their capsules. Nests separate into single nematocytes when the formation of the capsule is complete. Most of them migrate to the tentacles where they are incorporated into battery cells, which hold several nematocytes, and neurons. Battery cells coordinate firing of nematocytes.

In the hydrozoan jellyfish Clytia hemisphaerica, nematogenesis takes place at the base of the tentacles, as well as in the manubrium. At the base of the tentacles, nematoblasts proliferate then differentiate along a proximal-distal gradient, giving rise to mature nematocytes in the tentacles through a conveyor belt system.

In the Anthozoan sea anemone Nematostella vectensis, nematocytes are thought to develop throughout the animal from epithelial progenitors.

Cnidocyst maturation 
The nematocyst forms through a multi-step assembly process from a giant post-Golgi vacuole. Vesicles from the Golgi apparatus first fuse onto a primary vesicle: the capsule primordium. Subsequent vesicle fusion enables the formation of a tubule outside of the capsule, which then invaginates into the capsule. Then, an early maturation phase enables the formation of long arrays of barbed spines onto the invaginated tubule through the condensation of spinalin proteins. Finally, a late maturation stage gives rise to undischarged capsules under high osmotic pressure through the synthesis of poly-γ-glutamate into the matrix of the capsule. This trapped osmotic pressure enables rapid thread discharge upon triggering through a massive osmotic shock.

Nematocyst toxicity 

Nematocysts are very efficient weapons. A single nematocyst has been shown to suffice in paralyzing a small arthropod (Drosophila larva). The most deadly cnidocytes (to humans, at least) are found on the body of a box jellyfish. One member of this family, the sea wasp, Chironex fleckeri, is "claimed to be the most venomous marine animal known," according to the Australian Institute of Marine Science. It can cause excruciating pain to humans, sometimes followed by death. Other cnidarians, such as the jellyfish Cyanea capillata (the "Lion's Mane" made famous by Sherlock Holmes) or the siphonophore Physalia physalis (Portuguese man o' war, "Bluebottle") can cause extremely painful and sometimes fatal stings. On the other hand, aggregating sea anemones may have the lowest sting intensity, perhaps due to the inability of the nematocysts to penetrate the skin, creating a feeling similar to touching sticky candies. Besides feeding and defense, sea anemone and coral colonies use cnidocytes to sting one another in order to defend or win space.

Venom from animals such as cnidarians, scorpions and spiders may be species-specific. A substance that is weakly toxic for humans or other mammals may be strongly toxic to the natural prey or predators of the venomous animal. Such specificity has been used to create new medicines and bioinsecticides, and biopesticides.

Animals in the phylum Ctenophora ("sea-gooseberries" or "comb jellies") are transparent and jelly-like but have no nematocysts, and are harmless to humans.

Certain types of sea slugs, such as the nudibranch aeolids, are known to undergo kleptocnidy (in addition to kleptoplasty), whereby the organisms store nematocysts of digested prey at the tips of their cerata.

See also
 Cnidosac, the sac in which an aeolid nudibranch stores the cnidocytes from its prey species

References

External links 
 Dangerous marine animals of Northern Australia: the Sea Wasp Australian Institute of Marine Science; dangers of box jellyfish
 Nematocysts Firing Movie
 
 Portuguese Man-of-War: Real Stories, Real People, Real Encounters.

Animal cells
Cnidarian anatomy